Pelecocera is a Holarctic genus of Hoverflies, from the family Syrphidae, in the order Diptera.
Antennae with segment 3 a half moon shape (flat above, only rounded below) or triangular, in the female the arista very thick, spike-like, inserted at the anterior extremity of segment 3.
They are small black and yellow or orange flies found mainly on heaths.

Species
P. apichaetus (Curran, 1923)
P. escorialensis Strobl, 1909
P. latifrons Loew, 1856
P. lugubris Perris, 1839
P. pergandei (Williston, 1884)
P. scaevoides (Fallén, 1817) now Chamaesyrphus
P. tricincta Meigen, 1822
P. willistoni Snow, 1895

References

External links
 Images representing Pelecocera

Diptera of Europe
Hoverfly genera
Eristalinae
Taxa named by Johann Wilhelm Meigen